Nicolaus Bernoulli (also spelled Nicolas or Nikolas; , Basel – 29 November 1759, Basel) was a Swiss mathematician and was one of the many prominent mathematicians in the Bernoulli family.

Biography
He was the son of Nicolaus Bernoulli, painter and Alderman of Basel. In 1704 he graduated from the University of Basel under Jakob Bernoulli and obtained his PhD five years later (in 1709) with a work on probability theory in law. His thesis was titled Dissertatio Inauguralis Mathematico-Juridica de Usu Artis Conjectandi in Jure.

In 1716 he obtained the Galileo-chair at the University of Padua, where he worked on differential equations and geometry. In 1722 he returned to Switzerland and obtained a chair in Logics at the University of Basel.

He was elected a Fellow of the Royal Society of London in March, 1714.

His most important contributions can be found in his letters, in particular to Pierre Rémond de Montmort. In these letters, he introduced in particular the St. Petersburg Paradox. He also communicated with Gottfried Wilhelm Leibniz and Leonhard Euler.

He died on 29 November 1759.

References

Bibliography

Further reading

External links
 

1687 births
1759 deaths
18th-century Swiss mathematicians
Probability theorists
Swiss Calvinist and Reformed Christians

Fellows of the Royal Society
Nicolaus I